Angela Ling (born 14 April 2004) is a Canadian-born ice dancer who currently represents the United States. With her skating partner, Caleb Wein, she is the 2022 JGP Russia bronze medalist, the 2022 U.S. junior national silver medalist, and finished seventh at the 2022 World Junior Figure Skating Championships.

Personal life 
Ling was born on 14 April 2004 in Kitchener, Ontario. As of 2022, she is a student at the University of California, Berkeley studying neuroscience and psychology.

Career

Early years 
Ling began learning to skate at age four through the CanSkate program at the Kitchener-Waterloo Skating Club. She began training in both freestyle and ice dance at age seven and competed in both disciplines until the 2018–19 season, after which she shifted her focus solely to ice dance. She competed with her previous partner, Quinn Bisson, domestically for Canada for one season before teaming up with Wein for the United States. Ling and Wein connected with each other through Ice Partner Search.

Programs

With Wein

Competitive highlights 
CS: Challenger Series; JGP: Junior Grand Prix

With Wein for the United States

With Bisson for Canada

With Wright for Canada

References

External links 
 

2004 births
Living people
Canadian female ice dancers
American female ice dancers
Sportspeople from Kitchener, Ontario
Competitors at the 2023 Winter World University Games